Clay Township is one of fourteen townships in Miami County, Indiana, United States. As of the 2010 census, its population was 844 and it contained 373 housing units.

History
Clay Township was organized in 1846. It is named for statesman Henry Clay of Kentucky.

Geography

Unincorporated towns
 Loree at 
 Wawpecong at

Cemeteries
The township contains Climer Cemetery.

Major highways
  Indiana State Road 18

School districts
 Maconaquah School Corporation

Political districts
 Indiana's 5th congressional district
 State House District 32
 State Senate District 18

References
 
 United States Census Bureau 2008 TIGER/Line Shapefiles
 IndianaMap

External links
 Indiana Township Association
 United Township Association of Indiana
 City-Data.com page for Clay Township

Townships in Miami County, Indiana
Townships in Indiana